Jos Valentijn (born 28 March 1952) is a retired speed skater from the Netherlands who specialized in the 500 m and 1000 m distances.

In 1973, Valentijn won a silver medal at the World Sprint Championships. In 1976, while leading after three events he was disqualified at the 1000 m for three consecutive false starts and was left without a medal.

His wife, Haitske Pijlman, is also a former competitive speed skater; their daughter Rikst Valentijn is an artistic gymnast.

Personal records

Source:

Tournament overview

Source: 
DQ = Disqualified
DNF = Did not finish
NC = No classification

Medals won

References

External links
 
 

1952 births
Living people
People from Nieuwkoop
Dutch male speed skaters
Universiade medalists in speed skating
World Sprint Speed Skating Championships medalists
Universiade gold medalists for the Netherlands
Competitors at the 1972 Winter Universiade
Sportspeople from South Holland
20th-century Dutch people